Muang Kham may refer to:

Muang Kham, Laos
 Muang Kham, Chiang Rai, Thailand